The 1983 Scott Tournament of Hearts, the Canadian women's curling championship, was held from February 26 to March 5, 1983 at the Prince George Coliseum in Prince George, British Columbia. The total attendance for the event was 17,402. 

After using a four-team playoff the previous year, the playoff was reverted back to a three-team playoff with the round robin winner receiving a direct bye into the final.

Team Nova Scotia, who was skipped by Penny LaRocque won the event by defeating Alberta in the final 5–4. This was Nova Scotia's second consecutive championship and the only title won by LaRocque. This is also the first time that either Atlantic or Eastern Canada had won consecutive titles.

LaRocque's rink would go onto represent Canada at the 1983 Pioneer Life World Women's Curling Championship on home soil in Moose Jaw, Saskatchewan where they would lose in the semifinal to Norway.

The third place finish by Yukon/Northwest Territories would be the best finish ever by the Territories.

Teams
The teams were listed as follows:
{| border=1 cellpadding=5 cellspacing=0
!bgcolor="#0033ff" width="200"|
!bgcolor="#0099ff" width="200"|British Columbia
!bgcolor="#ffff99" width="200"|Manitoba
!bgcolor="#ffff33" width="200"|New Brunswick
|- align=center
|align=left|  Crestwood CC, Edmonton 
Skip:  Cathy Shaw
Third:  Christine Jurgenson
Second:  Sandra Rippel
Lead: Penny Ryan
Sweeper: Sandy Joyce
|align=left| Richmond WC, Richmond 
Skip:  Heather Kerr
Third: Berniece McCallan
Second: Sherry Lethbridge
Lead: Sandy McCubbin
|align=left| Granite CC, Winnipeg 
Skip:  Patti Vande
Third: Carol Dunstone
Second: Iris Armstrong
Lead: Maureen Bonar
|align=left| Capital WC, Fredericton 
Skip:  Grace Donald
Third: Connie Bothwell-Myers
Second: Carolyn McKay
Lead: Stella Keays
|- border=1 cellpadding=5 cellspacing=0
!bgcolor="#ff5577" width="200"|Newfoundland  
!bgcolor="#cc99ee" width="200"|Nova Scotia
!bgcolor="#ff7777" width="200"|Ontario
!bgcolor="#009900" width="200"|Prince Edward Island
|- align=center
|align=left| Carol CC, Labrador City 
Skip:  Ruby Crocker 
Third: Rene Crocker
Second: Barbara Pinset
Lead: Sandra Brawley
|align=left| CFB Halifax CC, Halifax 
Skip:  Penny LaRocque
Third: Sharon Horne
Second: Cathy Caudle
Lead: Pamela Sanford
|align=left| Fort William CC, Thunder Bay 
Skip:  Anne Provo
Third: Lorraine Lang
Second: Marlene Delorenzi
Lead: Valerie Adams
|align=left| Charlottetown CC, Charlottetown 
Skip:  Kim McLeod
Third: Cathy Dillon
Second: Karen MacDonald
Lead: Kathie Burke
|- border=1 cellpadding=5 cellspacing=0
!bgcolor="#00ffff" width="200"|Quebec 
!bgcolor="#33cc00" width="200"|Saskatchewan
!bgcolor="#cccccc" width="200"|Yukon/Northwest Territories
|- align=center
|align=left| Buckingham CC, Buckingham 
Skip:  Agnes Charette
Third: Linda Raby
Second: Guylaine Deschatelets
Lead: Odette Raby
|align=left| Nutana CC, Saskatoon 
Skip:  Sheila Rowan
Third: Jean MacLean
Second: Judy Sefton
Lead: Lillian Martin
|align=left| Whitehorse CC, Whitehorse 
Skip:  Shelly Bildfell
Third: Elizabeth McCrae
Second: Louise McCrae
Lead: Dale Sanderson
|}

Round Robin standingsFinal Round Robin standingsRound Robin results
Draw 1

Draw 2

Draw 3

Draw 4

Draw 5

Draw 6

Draw 7

Draw 8

Draw 9

Draw 10

Draw 11

Playoffs

SemifinalFriday, March 4, 7:30 pmFinalSaturday, March 5, 1:00 pmStatistics
Top 5 player percentagesFinal Round Robin Percentages''

Awards
The all-star team and sportsmanship award winners were as follows:

All-Star Team

Ina Hansen Award 
The Scotties Tournament of Hearts Sportsmanship Award is presented to the curler who best embodies the spirit of curling at the Scotties Tournament of Hearts. The winner was selected in a vote by all players at the tournament. 

Prior to 1998, the award was named after a notable individual in the curling community where the tournament was held that year.

Notes

References

Scotties Tournament of Hearts
Scott Tournament of Hearts
Scott Tournament Of Hearts, 1983
Sport in Prince George, British Columbia
Curling in British Columbia
1983 in women's curling
Scott Tournament of Hearts
Scott Tournament of Hearts